Ikechukwu Kalu (born 18 April 1984 in Kaduna) is a Nigerian footballer who plays as a striker. His name, Ikechukwu, means "Power of God".

Football career
He started his career at Jasper United in Nigeria. He was signed by U.C. Sampdoria in summer 2002. After played one season in Genoa, A.C. Milan signed him in summer 2003 in joint-ownership bid for €1 million, and saw Luca Antonini move to opposite direction in joint-ownership deal (for €2 million), and sent him on loan to Pisa and Chiasso. He scored 28 goals in 44 games in two season in Swiss second division, which saw Sampdoria recall him in summer 2007. He made his Serie A debut on 10 November 2007 against Empoli F.C.

In June 2008, Sampdoria bought back Kalu from Milan for €250,000 and co-currently signed Paolo Sammarco outright for another €2.5 million. Kalu then sold to the Swiss side AC Bellinzona for €400,000.

References

External links
Nigerianplayers.com profile
football.ch profile
AC Bellinzona profile 

Igbo sportspeople
Nigeria international footballers
Nigerian expatriate footballers
Nigerian footballers
U.C. Sampdoria players
Pisa S.C. players
FC Chiasso players
AC Bellinzona players
Serie A players
Swiss Super League players
Association football forwards
Expatriate footballers in Italy
Expatriate footballers in Switzerland
Expatriate footballers in Thailand
1984 births
Living people
Jasper United F.C. players
Sportspeople from Kaduna